Love at First Kiss is a 2023 Spanish romantic comedy film directed  by Alauda Ruiz de Azúa. It stars Álvaro Cervantes, Silvia Alonso, Susana Abaitua and Gorka Otxoa. The film follows Javier who, at the age of 16, kissing a girl for the first time, realised that he had a gift of romantic clairvoyance.

The film is available for streaming on Netflix from 3 March 2023.

Cast
 Álvaro Cervantes as Javier
 Silvia Alonso as Lucía
 Susana Abaitua 
 Gorka Otxoa
 Pilar Castro
 Elisabeth Larena
 Ninton Sánchez
 Paula Muñoz
 Fabia Castro
 Lara Oliete
 Mauro Muñiz De Urquiza
 Adrián Fernández Sánchez

Production
In April 2021, Netflix announced that they will produce romantic comedy film Eres tú with Zeta Studios.

The film was wrapped up in April 2022.

Release

As per announcement of 3 February, the   film premiered on Netflix on 3 March 2023.

Reception

Anne Campbell rated the film 3 stars out of 5 and called it a "A slow rom-com but not without some unique charms." Criticising the pace and lack of comedy Campbell closed her review as: "Love at First Kiss is unique enough to keep watching despite the limited comedy and pacing problems." Janire Zurbano rated the film 3.5 stars out of 5 for 20 Minutes Cinema and opined that film has neglected fantasy. Concluding, Zurbano deemed it as a, "Classic 'Rom-com' that confirms Álvaro Cervantes as Netflix's Hugh Grant. Kirsten Hawkes reviewing for Parent Previews graded the film as C and criticised the length of the film. Concluding, Hawkes wrote, that she was not impressed albeit the plot is sufficiently novel that it kept her focused, but to her the "biggest weakness" was that, it moved in some unexpected directions but telegraphed those changes a bit too far in advance."

References

External links
 
 
 

2023 films
2020s Spanish-language films
2020s Spanish films
Spanish romantic comedy films
Spanish-language Netflix original films